Villa de Guadalupe may refer to:
Villa de Guadalupe, Mexico City, Mexico
 Villa de Guadalupe, San Luis Potosí, Mexico